Vicki Ann Ellis is a Saint Lucian lawyer and judge. She has been a High Court Judge of the Eastern Caribbean Supreme Court since 2012.

Ellis earned a Bachelor of Laws degree from the University of the West Indies. She worked as a lawyer in Saint Lucia from 1996 to 2003, including several years as Crown Counsel. In 2003, she moved to the Cayman Islands, where she was the Deputy Solicitor-General, a position she held until 2012. She earned an LL.M. degree from the University of London in 2005.

In March 2012, the Judicial and Legal Services Commission of the Caribbean Community appointed Ellis as a High Court Judge of the Eastern Caribbean Supreme Court; she was assigned to reside in and hear cases from Grenada. In September 2012, she was transferred to the High Court in the British Virgin Islands.

References
Eastern Caribbean Supreme Court: Territory of the Virgin Islands
"BVI Welcomes New Resident Judge, Madame Vicki Ann Ellis", BVI Platinum News, 2012-09-18.

Living people
Eastern Caribbean Supreme Court justices
Caymanian lawyers
20th-century Saint Lucian lawyers
Saint Lucian judges on the courts of Grenada
Saint Lucian judges on the courts of the British Virgin Islands
Saint Lucian emigrants to the Cayman Islands
Alumni of the University of London
University of the West Indies alumni
Women judges
Saint Lucian women lawyers
Saint Lucian judges of international courts and tribunals
Year of birth missing (living people)